Felipe Borges may refer to:

 Felipe Borges (handballer) (born 1985), Brazilian handball player
 Felipe Borges (canoeist) (born 1994), Brazilian slalom canoeist